The Gateway Cities Region, or Southeast Los Angeles County (also shortened to Southeast Los Angeles and Southeast LA) is an urbanized region located in southeastern Los Angeles County, California, between the City of Los Angeles proper, Orange County, and the Pacific Ocean. The cluster of cities has been termed "Gateway Cities" in that they serve as a "gateway" between the LA and Orange counties, with the city of Cerritos equidistant from Downtown L.A., Long Beach, and Santa Ana in Orange County. As such, the area is central to the Los Angeles-Long Beach-Anaheim, CA Metropolitan Statistical Area (MSA), and has a population of approximately 2,000,000 residents.

Despite a predominating urban fabric of single-family homes and low-rise multifamily residential structures, Southeast LA County comprises some of the most densely populated municipalities in the United States. As with other regions of Los Angeles, Southeast LA's demographics are notable for ethnic and age diversity.

The Gateway Cities Council of Governments (GCCOG), the coordinating body for the Southeast LA Region, is located in the city of Paramount.

Cities of Southeast LA
Area residents generally identify as being part of urban Los Angeles, despite technically living in separate, independent municipalities. The following cities are members of the Gateway Cities Council of Governments, though these cities at times may also be considered part of other LA regions, including the San Gabriel Valley Region, East Los Angeles Region, the South Los Angeles Region, and the Los Angeles Harbor Region.

Artesia
Bell
Bell Gardens
Bellflower
Cerritos
Commerce
Compton
Cudahy
Downey
Hawaiian Gardens
Huntington Park
La Habra Heights
La Mirada
Lakewood
Long Beach
Lynwood
Maywood
Montebello 
Norwalk
Paramount
Pico Rivera
Santa Fe Springs
Signal Hill
South Gate
Vernon
Whittier 

Also members of the Gateway Cities Council of Governments:

Avalon (on Catalina Island)
Los Angeles County
Port of Long Beach
City of Industry

Higher education

Universities
The region hosts the following colleges and universities:

Community colleges

Infrastructure

Air
Southeast LA County's Long Beach Airport (LGB) provides Southeast LA regular direct flights to and from approximately a dozen cities in the Western United States.

Sea and heavy rail
The Port of Long Beach, located in Southeast LA, is the second busiest port in the United States, Significant freight rail infrastructure runs through Vernon, Commerce, Industry, Santa Fe Springs, and Pico Rivera; as well as lines running between the Port of Long Beach and Vernon & Commerce.

Commuter and light rail
The LA Metro connects Southeast LA County to Greater Los Angeles via the following commuter and light rail lines:
A Line (formerly the "Blue Line"), connecting to downtown Los Angeles
C Line (formerly the "Green Line"), connecting to LAX and the Beach Cities
West Santa Ana Branch Transit Corridor (planned and funded under Measure M)

Freeways
Given its high population, Southeast LA is noticeably crisscrossed with regional freeway infrastructure, connecting it to other parts of Greater Los Angeles, Orange County, and the Inland Empire. The following freeways directly service Southeast LA County:
Interstate 5 also known as the Santa Ana Freeway
Interstate 405 also known as the San Diego Freeway
Interstate 605 also known as the San Gabriel Freeway
Interstate 105 also known as the Glenn Andersen Freeway
Interstate 710 also known as the Long Beach Freeway
Interstate 110 also known as the Harbor Freeway
California State Route 91 also known as the Artesia Freeway
California State Route 60 also known as the Pomona Freeway
California State Route 22 also known as the 7th Street Extension
California State Route 1 Pacific Coast Highway also known as the Pacific Coast Highway

References

External links

 Gateway Cities Council of Governments

 
Los Angeles County, California regions